Sukhteh Kuh or Sookhteh Kooh may refer to:
 Sukhteh Kuh, Astaneh-ye Ashrafiyeh
 Sukhteh Kuh, Lahijan